José Luis García is a Guatemalan wrestler. He competed in two events at the 1968 Summer Olympics.

References

External links
 

Year of birth missing (living people)
Living people
Guatemalan male sport wrestlers
Olympic wrestlers of Guatemala
Wrestlers at the 1968 Summer Olympics
People from Alta Verapaz Department